Parablennius intermedius, the false Tasmanian blenny or horned blenny, is a species of combtooth blenny found in the Indian ocean near Australian coasts.  This species reaches a length of  TL.

References

External links 
 Fishes of Australia : Horned Blenny, Parablennius intermedius (Ogilby 1915)

intermedius
Marine fish of Eastern Australia
Fish described in 1915
Taxa named by James Douglas Ogilby